The women's 50 metre freestyle competition of the swimming events at the 1991 Pan American Games took place on 18 August. The last Pan American Games champion was Jenny Thompson of US.

This race consisted of one length of the pool in freestyle.

Results
All times are in minutes and seconds.

Heats

Final 
The final was held on August 18.

References

Swimming at the 1991 Pan American Games
Pan